The following is a list of the monastic houses in Merseyside, England.

See also
 List of monastic houses in England

Notes

References

Medieval sites in England
Merseyside
Merseyside
Lists of buildings and structures in Merseyside